Giacomo Castellini (active 1678) was an Italian painter of the Baroque period.

He was a pupil of Francesco Gessi in Bologna. He painted a copy of Guido Reni's  Massacre of the Innocents for the Basilica of San Petronio.

References

Year of birth unknown
Year of death unknown
17th-century Italian painters
Italian male painters
Painters from Bologna
Italian Baroque painters